Historical Dictionary of Poland, 966–1945 is a 1996 book by George J. Lerski described as the "authoritative, historical dictionary of Poland".

In 1999 it received a sequel by Piotr Wróbel, Historical Dictionary of Poland, 1945-1996.

References

1996 non-fiction books
History books about Poland
Historical dictionaries